The canton of Fribourg, also canton of Freiburg is located in western Switzerland. The canton is bilingual, with French spoken by more than two thirds of the citizens and German by a little more than a quarter. Both are official languages in the canton. The canton takes its name from its capital city of Fribourg.

History
On the shores of Lake Neuchâtel and Lake Morat significant traces of prehistoric settlements have been unearthed.

The canton of Fribourg joined the Swiss Confederation in 1481. The area is made up of lands acquired by the capital Fribourg. The present extent was reached in 1803 when Murten (Morat) was acquired. The canton of Fribourg joined the separatist league of Catholic cantons in 1846 (Sonderbund). The following year, its troops surrendered to the federal army.

Geography

The canton is bounded to the west by Lake Neuchâtel, to the west and the south by the canton of Vaud, and to the east by the canton of Bern. The canton includes two enclaves within Vaud and one within the canton of Bern, as well as a large exclave on the lake; it also enclaves the Bernese municipality of Münchenwiler.

The canton lies on the elevated Swiss Plateau. In the west the lands are flat, but towards the south east of the canton, the lands rise to a hilly region. This region is commonly called pre-Alps but is part of the Bernese Alps.

The river Saane/Sarine flows from the south to the north of the canton. Together with its tributaries it drains most of the lands in the canton, then joins the river Aare. The river Broye drains the west of the canton and flows northeast into Lake Morat (Murtensee). The southwest part of the canton is drained by the river Veveyse, which flows south into Lake Geneva.

Political subdivisions

Districts

The Canton is divided into seven districts:
Broye capital Estavayer-le-Lac
Glâne capital Romont
Gruyère capital Bulle
Sarine capital Fribourg
Lake capital Morat
Sense capital Tafers
Veveyse capital Châtel-Saint-Denis

Municipalities
There are 126 municipalities in the canton of Fribourg . The number is decreasing as the canton subsidizes mergers between municipalities.

Demographics
In contrast to the mainly Protestant cantons of Vaud to its west and Bern to its east, the canton of Fribourg is a predominantly Catholic enclave (70%) with a Protestant minority (15%). This explains why the canton straddles the French-German linguistic border, for in the past, denominational considerations were more important than linguistic when drawing Switzerland's cantonal borders.

The main centres of population are the capital Fribourg (34,300 inhabitants) and Bulle (18,200 inhabitants).

Two thirds of the population speak French; the remainder speak Alemannic dialects of German. The French-speaking areas are in the west of the canton, the Alemannic-speaking areas in the east. The number of bilingual towns, and consequently the large number of people who can speak both French and German fluently, has attracted businesses such as telesales companies. , the population included 43,838 foreign-born residents, or about 16.65% of the total population.

Historical population 
The historical population is given in the following table:

Economics 
Agriculture is important in the canton of Fribourg. The main agricultural activities are cattle breeding and dairy farming. The region is a major cheese producer, especially the district of Gruyère, home of the cheese of the same name. The chocolate industry is also well established in Broc, home to an international chocolate research centre. Other agricultural produces include tobacco, fruit and cereals. Agriculture is predominant in the north of the canton where the most fertile lands lie.

There is light industry concentrated around the capital Fribourg. Other centres of light industry are Bulle, Villars-sur-Glâne, Düdingen (Guin), Murten (Morat) and Estavayer-le-Lac. These five centers have also a large number of established small and medium-sized businesses, many of which are in the service sector. Forests are important in the La Gruyère (Greyerz) district.

Power plants in the district of Sarine export electricity. The mountain areas attract tourists all year round. The lake regions are frequented by tourists in summer and autumn.

Transport

The canton of Fribourg is well connected to other areas of Switzerland with motorways A1, A12 and fast rail links. The main railway between Geneva and Lausanne in the south west to Bern and Zürich connects Fribourg with other centres of the country. Connections within the canton are mostly provided by the Transports Publics Fribourgeois, with numerous bus routes and trains connecting the main towns.

Politics

Federal election results

 FDP before 2009, FDP.The Liberals after 2009
 "*" indicates that the party was not on the ballot in this canton.
 Included under "Other" in this election.

See also
 List of castles and fortresses in Switzerland
 Franco-Provençal language

Notes and references

External links

 
 Official site 
 Official statistics

 
Cantons of Switzerland
Cantons of the Helvetic Republic
15th-century establishments in the Old Swiss Confederacy
1480s establishments in the Holy Roman Empire
1481 establishments in Europe